Paul Arif Karabardak (born 3 October 1985) is a Welsh para table tennis player who has competed in three Summer Paralympics.

Biography
Karabardak was a keen footballer when he was a child but he suffered from a massive stroke aged 10, he played table tennis after his stroke in a local youth club.

Sporting career
Aged 16 in 2001, Karabardak was chosen to participate in the GB Para Table Tennis Team in Frankfurt for the European Championships. He won his first national medal along with David Hope, a bronze in the teams' event. He continued to win two silver medals and two bronze medals in the team events. In 2017, in Lasko, Slovenia, Karabardak won his first ever European gold medal with David Wetherill and Martin Perry after defeating Croatia in the final.

2008 Summer Paralympics in Beijing, China were Karabardak's first Paralympic Games. He lost in the group stage of the tournament after losing to two matches and winning one. In the 2012 Summer Paralympics, he was second in his group by winning against Kim Young Sung and losing to bronze medalist Mykhaylo Popov. At his third games in Rio de Janeiro, he was bottom of his group and didn't advance to the final rounds.

References

1985 births
Living people
Sportspeople from Swansea
Paralympic table tennis players of Great Britain
Table tennis players at the 2008 Summer Paralympics
Table tennis players at the 2012 Summer Paralympics
Table tennis players at the 2016 Summer Paralympics
Table tennis players at the 2020 Summer Paralympics
Medalists at the 2020 Summer Paralympics
Paralympic bronze medalists for Great Britain
Paralympic medalists in table tennis